Boronia filicifolia is a plant in the citrus family, Rutaceae and is endemic to the far north-west of Australia. It is an erect or sprawling shrub with many branches, pinnate leaves with up to 55 leaflets and white to pink flowers with the sepals a similar length to the petals.

Description
The flowers are arranged singly or in groups of up to three in leaf axils. The eight stamens are hairy.

Taxonomy and naming
Boronia filicifolia was first formally described in 1863 by George Bentham from an unpublished description by Allan Cunningham and the description was published in Flora Australiensis from a specimen collected by Cunningham near York Sound. The specific epithet (filicifolia) is derived from the Latin filix, filicis meaning "a fern" and -folius meaning "leaved", referring to the fern-like leaves.

Distribution and habitat
Boronia filicifolia is a poorly-known plant that grows in heath and open woodland on sandstone and quartzite and occurs in the catchment of the Mitchell River and in the Port Warrender area of the western Kimberley region.

Conservation
Boronia filicifolia is classified as "Priority Two" by the Western Australian Government Department of Parks and Wildlife meaning that it is poorly known and from only one or a few locations.

References

filicifolia
Flora of Western Australia
Plants described in 1863
Taxa named by Allan Cunningham (botanist)
Flora of the Northern Territory